Sahamiyeh (also Romanized as Sahāmīyeh; also known as Nahumīyeh, Sarai, and Sarāy) is a village in Garmsir Rural District, in the Central District of Ardestan County, Isfahan Province, Iran. At the 2006 census, its population was 36, in 12 families.

References 

Populated places in Ardestan County